The 2023 Missouri Valley Conference Women's Basketball Tournament, popularly referred to as "Hoops in the Heartland", is a postseason women's basketball tournament that will complete the 2022–23 season in the Missouri Valley Conference. The tournament will be held at the Vibrant Arena at the Mark in Moline, Illinois, from March 9-12, 2023.

For the first time, the tournament will feature 12 teams. Belmont, Murray State, and UIC joined the conference in 2022 following Loyola Chicago's exit.

Seeds
Teams are seeded by conference record, with ties broken by the overall record in conference games played between the tied teams, then (if necessary) by comparison of records between the tying institutions versus the top team in the standings (and continuing from top to bottom of standings, as necessary, with the team having the better record against that team receiving the better seed). The top four seeds receive opening-round byes.

Schedule

Bracket

References

Missouri Valley Conference women's basketball tournament
2022–23 Missouri Valley Conference women's basketball season
College basketball tournaments in Illinois
Missouri Valley Conference women's basketball tournament
Missouri Valley Conference women's basketball tournament
Moline, Illinois
Women's sports in Illinois